Connectify is an American software company that develops networking software for consumers, professionals and companies. Connectify Hotspot is a virtual router software for Microsoft Windows, and Speedify is a mobile VPN service with channel bonding capabilities available for individuals, families and teams.

History 
Connectify launched their first product, Connectify Hotspot, in October 2009. It can enable a Windows PC to serve as a router over Ethernet or Wi-Fi. Along with a Windows 7, 8 or 10 certified Wi-Fi device it can act as a wireless access point. This enables users to share files, printers, and Internet connections between multiple computing devices without the need for a separate physical access point or router.

Connectify spent the next two years improving the product, first making it free and ad-supported. In 2011, Connectify switched to a freemium commercial model which included premium features for paying customers. These features included extended support of 3G/4G mobile devices, fully customizable SSIDs and premium customer support.

In 2011, Connectify received funding from In-Q-Tel to begin developing a more powerful and secure remote networking platform and a connection-aggregation application. Connectify used this funding to develop the foundation of the application, and then in 2012 turned to the crowdfunding site Kickstarter to raise additional funding to develop Connectify Dispatch. Dispatch was a load balancer which could combine any number of Ethernet, Wi-Fi or mobile Internet connections.

In 2014, Connectify launched Speedify, a channel bonding application for PCs running Microsoft Windows and macOS. In January 2016, Speedify for Mobile was launched at CES, adding support for iOS and Android. In December 2016, Speedify added encryption on all supported platforms, turning it into a mobile virtual private network.

Connectify released other apps: Pingify (in 2017) - a mobile network diagnostics tool, and EdgeWise Connect (in 2019).

Products

Connectify Hotspot 
Connectify Hotspot is a virtual router software application available for PCs running Windows 7 or a later version. It was launched in 2009 by Connectify and it has 3 main functions:

 Wi-Fi hotspot - users can share the Internet connection from their PC through a Wi-Fi adapter. The free version of Connectify Hotspot only allows sharing of wired or Wi-Fi Internet via Wi-Fi. The paid versions allow users to share any type of Internet connection, including 4G / LTE. through Wi-Fi or Ethernet.
 Wired router - users can share a computer's Wi-Fi connection via Ethernet. This functionality is only available in the paid versions of Connectify Hotspot.
 Wi-Fi repeater - users can extend the range of a Wi-Fi network and bridge other devices on that network directly. This functionality is only available in the paid versions of Connectify Hotspot.
Starting with version 2017, Connectify Hotspot also incorporates a universal ad blocker for clients connecting to the Wi-Fi or Ethernet network it creates. This feature is available for free.

Speedify 
Speedify is a mobile VPN bonding service available for devices running Windows, macOS, Android and iOS. Speedify 1.0 was launched in June 2014 as a channel bonding service.

Speedify can combine multiple Internet connections given its link aggregation capabilities. In theory, this should offer faster Internet connection speeds and failover protection.

Starting 2016, as a VPN service, Speedify's privacy policy states they do not log what users do or what sites they visit through the Speedify service.

Starting with version 10, in 2020, Speedify provides QoS for live streams with its new streaming mode, which dynamically prioritizes streaming traffic.

Speedify can be used for free for the first 2 GB each month; there are monthly and yearly subscription plans available. 

Tom's Guide picked Speedify as the fastest VPN in late 2018. Speedify became Citrix Ready in late 2019.

Speedify for Teams 
Speedify for Teams is Connectify's business product. It is basically a multi-seat Speedify mobile VPN subscription with added centralized account management capabilities.

Pingify 
Pingify is a free utility for testing network coverage, Internet reliability and VPN dependability. It's currently available for iOS devices - it helps you run ping on your iPhone.

Pingify was developed as an internal testing tool for Speedify on iOS - a mobile network diagnostics tool. Then, in 2017, it was made publicly available.

EdgeWise Connect 
EdgeWise Connect is a simple VPN available for iPhone and Android which can seamlessly move web traffic between the Wi-Fi and cellular data connections. The service uses channel bonding technology and is fully encrypted.

EdgeWise Connect was launched in early 2019 and can be used for free for a few hours each day; there are monthly and yearly subscription plans available.

References

External links 
 
Speedify website
EdgeWise Connect website
Pingify website

2009 software
Windows-only shareware
Windows-only freeware
Communication software
Routing software
File sharing software
Servers (computing)